Streaker may refer to:

 Someone who engages in streaking, purposely appearing and running nude in public
 Streaker (dinghy), a sailing dinghy
Streaker (video game), a 1987 computer game published by Bulldog
 Combat Vehicle Reconnaissance (tracked), a high-mobility carrier vehicle named Streaker, from the United Kingdom
 Streaker (SpaceDev), a small launch vehicle
 MQM-107 Streaker, a target-towing drone used by the U.S. Army and Air Force
 The Streaker, a starship crewed by dolphins, from David Brin's Uplift Universe novels

See also
 Streak (disambiguation)